The Simón Bolívar International Bridge is a  bridge across the Táchira River on the Venezuela–Colombia border, connecting the city of San Antonio del Tachira in Venezuela with the small town of La Parada in Colombia. The first major city in Colombia after the border is Cúcuta.

Until the Venezuelan economic crisis, it was a popular crossing point for Colombians to shop across the border. In 2015, Venezuelan President Nicolás Maduro closed the bridge to vehicular traffic. Since at least 2017, the traffic is mostly people leaving Venezuela.

References

External links
 

Colombia–Venezuela border crossings
Bridges completed in the 20th century